Anzac Highway is an  main arterial road heading southwest from the city of Adelaide, the capital of South Australia, to the beachside suburb of Glenelg.

Originally named the Bay Road (which remains an informal synonym), it mostly follows the track made by the pioneer James Chambers from Holdfast Bay, the first governor's landing site, to Adelaide. It gained its current name in 1923 to honour the contribution of the ANZACs (Australian and New Zealand Army Corps) in World War I.

Route
Commencing at the intersection with South Terrace, West Terrace and Goodwood Road on the Adelaide city centre's south-western corner, Anzac Highway heads southwest through the Adelaide Park Lands, through Plympton, before turning west through Camden Park and eventually terminating at the bayside suburb of Glenelg.

The highway is serviced by a 15-minute "Go Zone", serviced by the 262, 263 and 265 buses.

History

The road from the city to Holdfast Bay was originally named the Bay Road.  After the state government was lobbied in 1917 the by the ANZAC Memorial League to rename it in honour of the ANZAC troops who fought in World War I, it eventually renamed the road to Anzac Highway in 1923, at the same time doing some roadworks. In 1937 the government, in collaboration with the West Torrens Council, Unley Council and Glenelg Council Council agreed on a plan for the future of the road, which was ratified by Parliament by the passing of the Anzac Highway Memorial Act 1937. The plan included developing a dual carriageway which included trees on the central reservation and along the verges, to be maintained by the respective councils. The trees chosen were the claret ash.

On 18 September 1918, a tram line opened from Sturt Street, via West Terrace and then down the Bay Road to Keswick. It was used to transport soldiers returned from World War I to the military hospital there.  Known as the West City Line, ran down West Terrace and Goodwood Road turned west into Park Terrace (now Greenhill Road) before turning in to Bay Road, and terminating at the entry to the Keswick Barracks. After redevelopment of Anzac Highway in the 1930s, the tram line was eventually truncated at the new Keswick Road Bridge in March 1939, at a stop known as Wayville West. This line was closed in December 1957.

The South Road intersection with Anzac Highway saw major construction works in 2007-2009 as part of a South Australian Government initiative to transform South Road into a non-stop north–south route. Under the works, both routes became grade-separated, with South Road proceeding through an underpass with bi-directional controlled exits onto Anzac Highway. The underpass model is a diamond interchange. Construction began in October 2007, and the underpass was opened in March 2009, named the Gallipoli Underpass, in keeping with the Anzac theme. Each of the four corners of the intersection has a display to commemorate those who fought in the war.

Major intersections

In popular culture
Anzac Highway is mentioned in the song "One More Boring Night in Adelaide" by Redgum on their 1978 album If You Don't Fight You Lose.

See also

 Highways in Australia
 List of highways in South Australia

Notes

References

Further reading

 The opening of the "Gallipoli Underpass".

Roads in Adelaide
ANZAC (Australia)